Zhang Baosheng was a Chinese diplomat who served as the Chinese Ambassador to Mozambique between 1986 and 1989, and the Chinese Ambassador to Angola between 1992 and 1994.

References

Ambassadors of China to Mozambique
Ambassadors of China to Angola
Living people
Date of birth missing (living people)
Year of birth missing (living people)